Zygmunt Grabowski (13 August 1891 – 19 September 1939) was a Polish painter. His work was part of the painting event in the art competition at the 1936 Summer Olympics.

References

External links
 

1891 births
1939 deaths
20th-century Polish painters
20th-century Polish male artists
Olympic competitors in art competitions
Artists from Lublin
Polish male painters
Polish military personnel killed in World War II